Find My Way Home is the second album by Kieran Kane and his last one for Atlantic Records before starting his own label, Dead Reckoning Records, with fellow musicians, Kevin Welch, Harry Stinson, Tammy Rogers and Mike Henderson.

Track listing

Musicians
Kieran Kane: Lead Vocals, Mandolin, Acoustic Guitar, Bouzouki
Jay Spell: Accordion on track 3
Emmylou Harris, Glen Duncan, Harry Stinson: Backing Vocals on tracks 2 and 8
Harry Stinson: Drums
Glenn Worf: Electric Bass, Acoustic Bass
Billy Bremner: Electric Guitar, Acoustic Guitar
Dan Dugmore: Electric Guitar, Acoustic Guitar, Resonator Guitar, Lap Steel Guitar, Steel Guitar
Glen Duncan: Fiddle
Sam Bacco: Percussion on track 10

Production
Harry Stinson, Kieran Kane: Producers
Peter Coleman: Engineer
Jon Lechner: Assistant Engineer
Wayne Morgan: Assistant Engineer
Denny Purcell: Mastering
John Guess: Mixing Engineer
Marty Williams: Mixing Assistant
Elizabeth Workman: Design
June Arnold: Make-Up
Jerry Joyner: Cover Design, Design
Ron Keith: Photography
Track information and credits taken from the album's liner notes.

References

External links
Dead Reckoning Records Official Site
Atlantic Records Official Site

1993 albums
Atlantic Records albums
Kieran Kane albums